The unorganized territory (UT) of Maine is that area of Maine having no local, incorporated municipal government. The unorganized territory consists of 429 townships (including the Baxter State Park area), plus many coastal islands that do not lie within municipal bounds.  The UT land area is slightly over one half the area of the entire State of Maine. Year round residents number approximately 9,000, with many more people seasonally residing in the UT.

Most of the UTs in the northern and eastern areas of the state have numerical references such as T13 R16 WELS and do not have names.

Partial list of named unorganized territories in Maine in table format sortable by column header.

Partial list of named unorganized territories

See also
List of cities in Maine
List of towns in Maine
List of plantations in Maine

References

Geography of Maine
Places